Aivi & Surasshu (stylized as aivi & surasshu) are an electronic composer duo, composed of pianist Aivi Tran and electronic artist Steven "Surasshu" Velema. They are known for composing soundtracks, including that of Cartoon Network's animated series Steven Universe. The two married in 2015.

Career

The Black Box (2012–2013) 
Aivi Tran and Steven Velema first met in person at GDC in 2012 (before GDC, they had interacted only on Twitter), and discussed the idea of a piano/chiptune hybrid project.

Communicating after the convention, the two collaborated on an independent album project entitled The Black Box, and released on Ubiktune in 2013. The project was a combination of original piano and chiptune music, with several video game covers including "Lonely Rolling Star" from Katamari Damacy. The album was positively received, with Kotaku describing it as "lush, melodic, and well put-together".

Steven Universe (2013–2019) 
The duo were suggested to creator Rebecca Sugar of the animated television series Steven Universe by storyboard artist Jeff Liu, shortly after the release of The Black Box, and were subsequently brought onto the project. The duo made use of leitmotifs expressing each character's personality, which changes slightly depending on the situation. The character Pearl was often accompanied by a piano, Garnet by a synth bass, Amethyst by drums, and Steven with chiptune tones. They worked with guitarist Stemage on some parts of the soundtrack, including the opening for the second season.

The first volume of the Steven Universe soundtrack reached #22 on the Billboard 200. A second volume followed in 2019, peaking at #28 on the Billboard 200, and #12 on the US iTunes chart.

Other projects
The duo subsequently worked on numerous video game soundtracks including Soul Saga, Ikenfell, Cryamore and Way to the Woods, as well as several interactive Google Doodles.

References

Electronic music duos
Animation composers
Video game composers
Married couples
Musical groups established in 2013